947 (formerly 94.7 Highveld Stereo) is a radio station that broadcasts on the 94.7FM frequency from Johannesburg, Gauteng, South Africa.

History 
The station first went on the air on 1 September 1964, as the first SABC regional FM service, Radio Highveld. At that time the station broadcast hourly news bulletins and easy listening music. In September 1996 the SABC sold Radio Highveld to private enterprise.

Today this station, along with a number of other radio stations in South Africa, is owned by Primedia.

On 1 September 2014 the station decided to drop the logo that they have been using for over a decade. The station is also no longer known as Highveld Stereo as the name changed to being just 947.

According to the latest BRC RAM figures shows that 947 has crossed the milestone of 1 million listeners per week. The survey indicated that 947 has 1,055,000 listeners, up from 704,000 year-on-year – a huge leap and one that makes 947 the biggest regional station in Gauteng.

Format and Programming 

According to SAARF, 947 (formerly 94.7 Highveld Stereo) is ranked as South Africa's 15th most listened to radio station, with an average weekly listenership of 1.2 million people.

The target listener demographic is aimed at 25- to 40-year-olds, and as such the station tends to play contemporary "soft" rock, and current pop hits, but has moved away from playing the classic hits, which was consistent with their format up until a programming overhaul in 2010.

947 plays South African Music that record companies push, although the station has refused on many occasions to play any Afrikaans music.  Other services to listeners include news bulletins and traffic reports for Johannesburg and Pretoria, although the frequency of these reports have often been criticised by listeners as being too frequent and annoying.

Breakfast Show History

The Rude Awakening 

Once Radio Highveld was sold by the SABC, The "Rude Awakening" took over from the Mike Mills Show as the station's breakfast show. The show ran from 1997 to 2010 and featured Jeremy Mansfield as the anchor host, supported by (among others) Sam Cowan, Paul Rotherham, Graeme Joffe, Harry Sideroppolis, and Darren Simpson.
In July 2010 Mansfield was stated that "The show needs to move forward and I don't see a role for myself in the new product offering. Management and the board have asked if I would assist with off air initiatives, which I am happy to do for the foreseeable future.". The format of the new breakfast show remained largely unchanged with the rest of the original team remaining as is.

The Breakfast Xpress 

On 2 August 2010 the station revamped the morning show by renaming it Breakfast Xpress and appointing Darren Simpson as the new front-man in place of Jeremy Mansfield.
The show has been criticised for its childish nature, unprofessionalism, and poor production. The show became infamous for Whackhead's pranks which aired daily on the show. 
In 2017, Simpson announced that he would be leaving the breakfast show in order to spend more time with his family, but that he would nonetheless still host the station's drive-time show.
This left listeners feeling confused and betrayed when they discovered that Simpson was to be the new host of sister station KFM's Breakfast Show and stepping away from the afternoon drive show on 947.

947 Breakfast Club 

On 2 March 2017 it was announced that Anele Mdoda will be taking over the Breakfast show from 3 April 2017 with her existing crew – Alex Caige, Thembekile Mrototo, and Cindy Poluta – they welcomed a brand new member to the team: Frankie du Toit.

Anele and The Club 

In November 2020, 947 announced that  its popular morning drive show has rebranded to Anele and the Club on 947. The same presenters but refreshed programming aims to provide 'more laughs, more fun and more music'. The station has also announced that the programme's new pay-off line is 'Joburg's Most Fun Breakfast Show'.

Breakfast with Thando

In early 2022, 947 introduced Breakfast with Thando, featuring Thando Thabete, a drive presenter for 947. She is a temporary stand-in after main host of Anele and the Club, Anele Mdoda, announced a 2-mouth hiatus from the station. The time slot remains the traditional 6-9 A.M.

Current Line Up (as of July 2022)

Weekdays 
00:00 - 05:00: Essential 947

05:00 - 06:00: Daybreak with Nick Explicit

06:00 - 09:00: Anele and the Club

09:00 - 12:00: Msizi James on 947

12:00 - 15:00: Afternoons with Zweli

15:00 - 19:00: 947 Drive with Thando

19:00 - 22:00:(Monday - Thursday)

19:00 - 22:00: 947 Block Party with Chrizz Beatz Part 1 (Friday)

22:00 - 00:00: 947 Block Party (Friday)

Weekends 
04:00 - 07:00: 947 Weekends

07:00 - 10:00: 947 Weekend Breakfast with Hulisani

10:00 - 14:00: 947 Top 40 with Zweli (Saturday)

10:00 - 14:00: 947 Sundays with Nick Explicit (Sunday)

14:00 - 18:00: Tholi B Weekends on 947

18:00 - 21:00: 947 Block Party with Chrizz Beatz (Saturday)

21:00 - 00:00: 947 Block Party (Saturday)

Concerts

Joburg Day

Joburg Day is an annual music festival featuring only local artist from across South Africa.

Big Concerts

947 together with Big concerts over the years has brought some of the world's biggest international artists such as Justin Bieber, The Script, Ed Sheeren, Sam Smith, Katy Perry, Guns and Roses, One Direction and One Republic.

Ultra South Africa

947 is the official media partner for Ultra South Africa, Africa's largest electronic music Festival.

Charity work 
947 is well known for sponsoring and promoting many charity and social events in Gauteng, including the Momentum 947 Cycle Challenge and the Rude Awakening Christmas Wish, although their commercial interests are always given priority.

On Friday, (7 Oct 2016) Darren spoke to Caylum's mother Samantha about Caylum's condition, which is precarious, and the progress of their fundraiser, which had already reached a R4 million. Darren urged any listeners who could, to donate to get Caylum to Boston.

Within an hour, over R1,5 million had been pledged. Friends of the show including musician Daniel Baron called in as did hundreds of others. Families donated; a man donated his R100 000 nest egg; pensioners; students as well as companies big and small all pledged. By the end of the show, once all the donations have been tallied R3,8 million had been raised, more than double what was needed for this trip to Boston.

The Breakfast Xpress team visited the residents of Kwaggaspoort to hand over R10 000 worth of products. A further R120 000 in cash and products will also be donated to residents over the next 12 months.

Kwaggaspoort Reddingsdaad strives to help those less privileged by providing them with a temporary but safe livelihood until they can become independent members of society.  Most people who seek help from Kwaggaspoort Rescue Center have no possessions and are unemployed. Many of them have not eaten in days, some have children with them and quite often, it is the elderly whose family and friends are not able to look after them.

The Rescue Center consists of three houses which accommodates about 100 people. Over and above, Kwaggaspoort Rescue Center looks after 34 families as well as the elderly by providing them with food, clothing and other basic needs.

947's Darren received a heartwarming email from a caring sister asking the team to please help her ill brother to fulfill his bucket list. Among other things, he would like to meet the 947 Breakfast Xpress team, swim with dolphins, have lunch with Kurt Darren, have a flying experience, going to the planetarium and more. 
Within a few an hour the city of Joburg came together to tick of his bucket list.

947 also hosts the annual Christmas wish where they help those in need.

Legal actions

Zuma vs. Highveld 

In response to Darren Simpson's parody of South African Deputy President Jacob Zuma's ongoing rape trial of 2006 –for which Zuma was acquitted– Zuma filed a defamation lawsuit on 30 June 2006, for the sum of R 5 million.  Zuma originally filed for R 2 million, but this was upped when Highveld Stereo re-broadcast the allegedly offensive skit.

702 and 94.7 vs. Forum of Black Journalists 
In early 2008 Highveld together with their sister station Radio 702 submitted a complaint to the South African Human Rights Commission after the Forum of Black Journalists refused white journalists entry to a lunch with ANC President Jacob Zuma.

Broadcast time
24/7

Listenership figures

See also 
Primedia
94.7 Cycle Challenge
Jacob Zuma
Independent Communications Authority of South Africa
Broadcasting Complaints Commission of South Africa

References

External links 
Highveld Stereo Webpage
Mark Pilgrim's website
94.7 Highveld Stereo Live Streaming
SAARF Website
Sentech Website
947 Live Stream + songs played

 

Radio stations in Johannesburg
Radio stations established in 1964